The county of Norfolk is divided into seven districts, namely Norwich, South Norfolk, Great Yarmouth, Broadland, North Norfolk, King's Lynn and West Norfolk, and Breckland.

As there are 540 Grade I listed buildings in the county they have been split into separate lists for each district.

 Grade I listed buildings in Breckland
 Grade I listed buildings in Broadland
 Grade I listed buildings in Great Yarmouth
 Grade I listed buildings in King's Lynn and West Norfolk
 Grade I listed buildings in North Norfolk
 Grade I listed buildings in Norwich
 Grade I listed buildings in South Norfolk

See also
 :Category:Grade I listed buildings in Norfolk
 Grade II* listed buildings in Norfolk

References 
National Heritage List for England

 
Lists of Grade I listed buildings in Norfolk